Rainer Jacob (born 15 September 1946) is a retired German swimmer who won a silver medal in the 4 × 100 m freestyle relay at the 1970 European Aquatics Championships. He finished sixth in the same event at the 1972 Summer Olympics.

His mother, Gisela Jacob-Arendt, and uncle, Heinz Arendt, were German Olympic swimmers.

References

1946 births
German male freestyle swimmers
Swimmers at the 1972 Summer Olympics
Olympic swimmers of West Germany
Sportspeople from Bremen
Living people
European Aquatics Championships medalists in swimming
20th-century German people
21st-century German people